The  is one of two subway systems in Tokyo, the other being Tokyo Metro. The Toei Subway lines were originally licensed to the Teito Rapid Transit Authority (the predecessor of Tokyo Metro) but were constructed by the Tokyo Metropolitan Government following transfers of the licenses for each line. The subway has run at a financial loss for most of its history due to high construction expenses, particularly for the Oedo Line. However, it reported its first net profit of ¥3.13bn in FY2006. The Toei Subway is operated by the Tokyo Metropolitan Bureau of Transportation.

Tokyo Metro and Toei trains form completely separate networks. While users of prepaid rail passes can freely interchange between the two networks, regular ticket holders must purchase a second ticket, or a special transfer ticket, to change from a Toei line to a Tokyo Metro line and vice versa. The sole exceptions are on the segment of the Toei Mita Line between Meguro and Shirokane-Takanawa, where the platforms are shared with the Tokyo Metro Namboku Line, and at Kudanshita on the Shinjuku Line, where the platform is shared with the Tokyo Metro Hanzomon Line. At these stations, it is possible to change between the networks without passing through a ticket gate.

Branding 
Apart from its own logo, a stylized ginkgo leaf used as the symbol of the Tokyo Metropolis, Toei Subway shares a design language in common with Tokyo Metro. Lines are indicated by a letter in Futura Bold on a white background inside a roundel in the line color, with signs indicating stations adding the station number as well. Line colors and letter-designations are complementary with Tokyo Metro's, with none overlapping (e.g., the Mita Line's letter-designation is “I”, rather than “M”, which is used by the Tokyo Metro Marunouchi Line). Informational signage is also designed identically, with platform-level station placards differing only in the placement of the bands in the line color: Toei Subway has two thin bands at the top and bottom, while Tokyo Metro has one wider band at the bottom (or, in the case of long, narrow placards, in a continuous band extending to the left and right along the wall itself).

Lines 

Two of the lines have different colors for their station signs: Asakusa (Vermilion ) and Shinjuku (Lime ). The Ōedo Line formerly had a darker magenta (O) as its designated color.

Through services to other lines 
The different gauges of the Toei lines arose in part due to the need to accommodate through services with private suburban railway lines. Through services currently in regular operation include:

 Mita Line shares tracks of the section from Meguro to Shirokane-Takanawa with Tokyo Metro Namboku Line, .
According to the company, an average of 2.34 million people used the company's four subway routes each day in 2008.  The company made a profit of ¥12.2 billion in 2009.

Stations 

There are a total of 99 unique stations (i.e., counting stations served by multiple lines only once) on the Toei Subway network, or 106 total stations if each station on each line counts as one station. Almost all stations are located within the 23 special wards, with many located in areas not served by the complementary Tokyo Metro network.

Network Map (Link)

Rolling stock

References